Cemile Timur (born 2 August 1988) is a Turkish  former women's footballer and referee, who currently serves as manager of Hakkarigücü Spor in the Turkish Women's First Football League. She founded the first women's club at her hometown in 2008.

Early life 
Timur was born in Hakkâri, southeastern Turkey on 2 August 1988. She is the eldest daughter of a family with four children. She studied computer programming at Hakkâri Vocational School.

Sports career 
Timur started taking part in athletics at the age of nine. Although she became successful at several competitive events, she had to retire from active athletics sport after seven years in 2007 due to lack of support. Later, she developed an interest in association football. She is a certified coach for athletics and association football, as well as a referee for both sports.

Club founder 
During her high school years, Timur went to watch association football matches between girls at a regional boarding elementary school. At the same time, she served as referee in various interscholastic matches. After she witnessed the emotion and excitement of the spectators in the matches, she decided to form a girls' team. Despite the difficult sociocultural conditions due to the traditions of the strong conservative feudal society still existent in the Southeastern Anatolia Region, she was able to break down the taboos and form a team of girls, who came predominantly from villages in Hakkari Province. The girls saw a way out in a region with limited opportunities for girls by means of playing association football, despite cultural reactions to the wearing of shorts by girls. The parents supported their daughters because they were convinced that the girls could stand on their own feet by participating in sports in the university and earn money by this means.

20-year old Timur founded the first women's association football club Hakkarigücü Spor with only eight girls in April 2008 at a city, where this sport is dominated by males only. She was fully supported by her parents in her efforts. Her  club Hakkarigücü Spor participated in the 2007–08 Turkish Girls' Football Championship. The next season, the team was qualified to play in the Turkish Women's  Regional Football League. In the 2009–10 season, the team took part in the play-off matches for promotion to the Women's Second League, however they were unsuccessful. In 2010, two of the team were admitted to the Turkey girls' national U-15 and U-17 teams, who played at the 2010 Summer Youth Olympics in Singapore and in two friendly matches of the girls U-15 team. At the end of the 2010–11 season, the team was promoted to the Women's Second League. The club has currently about 50 adult players and 50 youth players in the lower-level teams.

Player 
Timur obtained her license as a football player from Hakkarigücü Spor on 11 November 2008. She started playing in her team's first season of 2009–10 in the Turkish Women's Regional League. She enjoyed her team's promotion to the Women's Second League at the end of the 2010–11 season. She played for eight seasons for her club in total, taking part in 104 matches and scoring 29 goals.

Manager 
Timur was appointed manager of the Women's Second League club Hakkarigücü Spor in November 2017. Finishing the 2017–18 league season as leader and winning the play-off matches, her team was promoted to the Women's First League in the 2018–19 season.

Player statistics 
.

Managerial statistics

Honours 
 Women's Regional League
 Hakkarigücü Spor
 Winners (1): 2010–11 (player)

 Women's Second League
 Hakkarigücü Spor
 Winners (1): 2017–18 (manager)

References 

Living people
1988 births
Sportspeople from Hakkari
Turkish women's footballers
Turkish football referees
Women association football referees
Turkish women's football managers
Turkish female association football managers
Hakkarigücü Spor players
Hakkarigücü Spor managers
Women's association footballers not categorized by position